Bruqin is a Palestinian town located 13 kilometers west of Salfit in the Salfit Governorate of the northern West Bank and adjacent to the Israeli settlement of Bruchin. According to the Palestinian Central Bureau of Statistics, the town had a population of 3,236 in 2007. Bruqin used to be on a camel-trading route. There is evidence of Roman rule in the city due to the presence of three ancient pools and a tomb.

The main families of the town are Barakat, Sabra, Samara and Khater.

Location
It is bordered by Salfit and Farkha to the east, Qarawat Bani Zaid, Kafr 'Ein and Bani Zeid to the south, Kafr ad Dik to the west, and Haris and Sarta to the north.

History
Bruqin is an ancient site. Here French explorer Victor Guérin found a large number of cut stones in the walls of modern houses, and an ancient tomb near the village with two sepulchral chambers.

Sherds from the Byzantine, Umayyad, Crusader/Ayyubid and Mamluk eras have been found here.

Ottoman era
The place appeared in 1596 Ottoman tax registers as Bruqin, being in the Nahiya of Jabal Qubal of the Liwa of Nablus. It had a population of 16 households, all Muslim. The villagers paid a fixed tax rate of 33,3% on wheat, barley, summer crops, olives, and goats or beehives, in addition for a press for olives or grapes; a total of 2,000 Akçe.

In 1838, Edward Robinson noted it as a village, Berukin, in the Jurat Merda district, south of Nablus.

In 1870, Victor Guérin estimated that the village had 300 inhabitants.

In 1882, PEF's Survey of Western Palestine, the village (called Berukin) was described as a "moderate-sized village on the end of a spur, with a steep slope to the valley beneath, in which are springs just below the houses. On the south are caves, on the north olives."

British Mandate era
In the 1922 census of Palestine conducted by the British Mandate authorities, Bruqin had a population of 367, all Muslims, increasing in the 1931 census to 534, again all Muslim, in a total of 90 houses.

In the 1945 statistics the population was 690, all Muslims, while the total land area was 12,628 dunams, according to an official land and population survey. Of this, 3,175 were allocated for plantations and irrigable land, 2,301 for cereals, while 28 dunams were classified as built-up areas.

Jordanian era
In the wake of the 1948 Arab–Israeli War, and after the 1949 Armistice Agreements, Bruqin came under Jordanian rule.

In 1961, the population was 1,141.

Post-1967
Since the Six-Day War in 1967, Bruqin has been under Israeli occupation. Its villagers state that after 1987, the toxic output from Israeli industries located in settlement areas has produced chronic health problems for local Palestinians.

Occupation of village lands
After the 1995 accords, 8.4% of village land is defined as being in Area A, 35.8% in Area B, while the remainder 55.8% is in Area C. In 1981, Israel confiscated 684 dunams of village land for the Barqan Industrial Zone, and in 1990 confiscated 332 dunums of village land for the Israeli settlement of Bruchin.

In 2014 the Shomron Regional Council began work to develop a 25-acre farm on a hill just northwest of Bruqin, forming part of 110 acres belonging to the nearby Palestinian villages of Adiq and Biddya. Though Adiq is in Area A, under Palestinian jurisdiction, its village lands lie in Area C, where Palestinian construction is prohibited, and which Israel declared its state land in 1985. Access to the farmland is through Bruqin's land, which is planted with their olive groves. The apparent intent is to create territorial continuity between the Green line and the Israeli settlement of Ariel, via new settlements such as Leshem and Bruchin. According to Bruqin villages, use of the access road is illegal, and Israel is blocking the villages' own roads to Sarta.

Economy
Around 70% of working-age males were employed in Israel as laborers prior to the Second Intifada. Today, the unemployment rate is 80%. There is agricultural work it is seasonal. Around 150 out of 500 families are dependent on aid, from the Red Cross or the Social Affairs Ministry of the Palestinian National Authority. There are two mosques, a youth club and a gym in the town. There are also three schools in the town, including an all-girls school for grades 1 to 12, a boys primary and secondary school and a boys high school. For hospital care, residents travel to Ramallah, but for emergency treatment they go to nearby Salfit.

Bruqin depends primarily on agriculture to meet its basic needs. The town's total land area is 13,237 dunams, of which 1,336 dunams is built-up area. Around 1,200 dunams are planted with orchards, especially olive, about 3,000 dunams of land is used for shepherding while approximately 8,000 dunams are used for settlement purposes, including settlements and by-pass roads.

Government
Bruqin is governed by a municipal council led by the mayor Ekremah M. Samara, who succeeded Ghassan Sabra. Elections are scheduled to occur every four years however, there has not been an election since 1996. The municipal council states the "[Israeli] occupation" as the reason.

References

Bibliography

External links
Welcome To Buruqin/Ibruqin
Survey of Western Palestine, Map 14:    IAA, Wikimedia commons 
 Bruqin Village Profile, iwps.info
Bruqin Town (Fact Sheet), Applied Research Institute–Jerusalem (ARIJ)
Bruqin Town Profile, ARIJ
Bruqin photo, ARIJ
Development Priorities and Needs in Bruqin, ARIJ
Bruchin settlement expands on lands of Bruqin village 08, October, 2011, POICA
  Torching 340 Trees in Bruqin – Salfit Governorate 14, November, 2011, POICA

Salfit Governorate
Towns in Salfit Governorate
Municipalities of West Bank
Municipalities of the State of Palestine